Larry Brett Krystkowiak (born September 23, 1964) is a retired American professional basketball player, and former head coach of the Utah Utes men's basketball team.

Early life
He was born in Missoula, Montana, to Bernard and Helen Krystkowiak.  At a young age, his mother always encouraged Larry to participate in sports.  His mother died of Hodgkin's lymphoma when he was eight years old and his father remarried.  He primarily grew up in Shelby, Montana, and his step-mother did not approve of Larry playing sports.  At the age of 15, Larry moved out of Shelby and finished his high school career at Big Sky High School in Missoula. During this time he lived with his older brother Bernie, who became Larry's legal guardian.

College career
Krystkowiak played college basketball for the University of Montana from 1982 to 1986 and still holds the school records for career points scored (2,017) and  rebounds (1,105).  He is the only person to have been named Big Sky Conference MVP three times (1984–1986).  Krystkowiak's jersey number was retired by the University of Montana.

Professional playing career
Krystkowiak was selected by the Chicago Bulls in the second round (28th overall pick) of the 1986 NBA draft. He played power forward for nine seasons in the NBA, spending the bulk of his career with the Milwaukee Bucks.  He also played for the San Antonio Spurs, Utah Jazz, Orlando Magic, Chicago Bulls and Los Angeles Lakers.  In the 1988–89 season he averaged 12.7 points, 7.6 rebounds, 1.3 assists and over 30 minutes per game for the Bucks. Over his NBA career, he averaged 8.1 points and 4.9 rebounds per contest.

NBA career statistics

Regular season

|-
| align="left" | 1986–87
| align="left" | San Antonio
| 68 || 2 || 14.8 || .456 || .083 || .743 || 3.5 || 1.3 || 0.3 || 0.2 || 6.6
|-
| align="left" | 1987–88
| align="left" | Milwaukee
| 50 || 7 || 21.0 || .481 || .000 || .811 || 4.6 || 1.0 || 0.4 || 0.2 || 7.2
|-
| align="left" | 1988–89
| align="left" | Milwaukee
| 80 || 77 || 30.9 || .473 || .333 || .823 || 7.6 || 1.3 || 1.2 || 0.1 || 12.7
|-
| align="left" | 1989–90
| align="left" | Milwaukee
| 16 || 7 || 23.8 || .364 || .000 || .788 || 4.8 || 1.6 || 0.6 || 0.1 || 7.0
|-
| align="left" | 1991–92
| align="left" | Milwaukee
| 79 || 16 || 23.4 || .444 || .000 || .757 || 5.4 || 1.4 || 0.7 || 0.2 || 9.0
|-
| align="left" | 1992–93
| align="left" | Utah
| 71 || 0 || 19.2 || .466 || .000 || .796 || 3.9 || 1.0 || 0.6 || 0.2 || 7.2
|-
| align="left" | 1993–94
| align="left" | Orlando
| 34 || 11 || 20.1 || .480 || .000 || .795 || 3.6 || 1.0 || 0.4 || 0.1 || 5.1
|-
| align="left" | 1994–95
| align="left" | Chicago
| 19 || 14 || 15.1 || .389 || .000 || .900 || 3.1 || 1.4 || 0.5 || 0.1 || 4.4
|-
| align="left" | 1996–97
| align="left" | Los Angeles
| 3 || 0 || 3.7 || .500 || .000 || .500 || 1.7 || 1.0 || 0.7 || 0.0 || 1.0
|- class="sortbottom"
| style="text-align:center;" colspan="2"| Career
| 420 || 134 || 21.7 || .457 || .139 || .795 || 4.9 || 1.2 || 0.6 || 0.1 || 8.2
|}

Playoffs

|-
| align="left" | 1987–88
| align="left" | Milwaukee
| 5 || 5 || 32.6 || .448 || .000 || .889 || 6.8 || 1.4 || 0.8 || 0.0 || 8.4
|-
| align="left" | 1988–89
| align="left" | Milwaukee
| 8 || 8 || 29.9 || .426 || .000 || .871 || 5.6 || 1.5 || 0.3 || 0.1 || 10.6
|-
| align="left" | 1990–91
| align="left" | Milwaukee
| 3 || 0 || 8.3 || .167 || .000 || .000 || 1.0 || 0.7 || 0.3 || 0.0 || 0.7
|-
| align="left" | 1992–93
| align="left" | Utah
| 1 || 0 || 8.0 || .000 || .000 || .000 || 2.0 || 0.0 || 0.0 || 0.0 || 0.0
|-
| align="left" | 1993–94
| align="left" | Orlando
| 3 || 3 || 30.7 || .389 || .000 || 1.000 || 8.3 || 3.0 || 1.0 || 0.7 || 6.0
|- class="sortbottom"
| style="text-align:center;" colspan="2"| Career
| 20 || 16 || 26.4 || .410 || .000 || .887 || 5.5 || 1.5 || 0.5 || 0.2 || 7.4
|}

Coaching career

Early career
Krystkowiak began his coaching career in 1998 as an assistant to Don Holst at his alma mater, the University of Montana.  He coached at Montana until 2000 when he left to join Old Dominion as an assistant under former Griz head coach, Blaine Taylor. He spent one season (2001–2002) at Old Dominion.

Krystkowiak got his first opportunity as a head coach with the CBA's Idaho Stampede in 2003–04.  In his single season as the Stampede's head coach, he led the team to a 37–16 record and a CBA championship game berth.

He was hired as head men's basketball coach at the University of Montana in May 2004.  He led the Griz to a 42–20 overall record over the course of the next two seasons, reaching the NCAA tournament each year as a result of winning the Big Sky Conference tourney.  In 2006 the Grizzlies beat heavily favored, fifth seed, Nevada, in the NCAA tournament.

NBA coaching career

In June 2006 Krystkowiak left Montana to take a job as an assistant coach with the Milwaukee Bucks under Terry Stotts.  Krystkowiak was responsible for working with Milwaukee's big men, notably second year players Andrew Bogut and Charlie Villanueva. He was named head coach of the team on March 14, 2007, after Stotts was fired.  Stotts had led the Bucks to a 23–41 record during the 2006–07 season.  He signed a reported 4-year contract with the Bucks, with an average annual salary of $2 million Krystkowiak's NBA head coaching debut on March 15, 2007, resulted in a 101–90 victory over the San Antonio Spurs.

On April 17, 2008, Krystkowiak was fired as Milwaukee Bucks head coach after a disappointing season in which the Bucks compiled the league's sixth worst record.

In July 2010 Krystkowiak joined the New Jersey Nets coaching staff alongside Avery Johnson and Sam Mitchell.

University of Utah

On April 3, 2011, it was announced that Krystkowiak would take over the head coaching position for the University of Utah men's basketball team, as they transitioned into Utah's first season in the newly realigned Pac-12.

After Krystkowiak was named Utah's head coach, eight players left the program to play elsewhere and he was forced to bring in several junior college and walk-on players to fill his depleted roster.  In a season where starting center David Foster missed the entire season and starting point guard Josh "Jiggy" Watkins was dismissed halfway through,  Krystkowiak and the Utes struggled to a 6-25 finish, including only three wins against their new Pac-12 opponents.

The 2012–2013 season showed much improvement for Krystkowiak's Utes.  The additions of freshmen Jordan Loveridge and Brandon Taylor, as well as great play and leadership from senior center Jason Washburn, would help Utah more than double their win total from the previous season.  On March 9, 2013, Utah closed out its season by defeating No. 19 Oregon, celebrating Senior Night at the Huntsman Center with the program's first victory over a ranked opponent since 2009. Utah then defeated USC and California in the first and second rounds of the Pac-12 tournament before losing a rematch with Oregon, the eventual champion.

Krystkowiak's third season saw the 2013–2014 Runnin' Utes reach their first postseason tournament under the coach.  The addition of transfer point guard Delon Wright and an improved core of players led Utah to a 21-12 record, receiving an at-large bid to the NIT. The next year, he led his team to the sweet sixteen, their highest run in the tournament in years. In 2017–18, he led the Utes to their first NIT finals appearance in 44 years.

The National Polish-American Sports Hall of Fame nominated Krystkowiak for its Class of 2013. On June 21, 2018 Krystkowiak was enshrined into the  National Polish-American Sports Hall of Fame as a member of the Class of 2018 in Troy, Michigan.

On March 16, 2021 Larry was fired by the University of Utah.

Personal life
Larry and his wife, Jan, have five children, Cam, Luc, Ben and twin girls Sam and Fin. He has seen his father only once in over 30 years, because of the issues in his early life.

Head coaching record
Larry Krystkowiak's record as a head coach.

CBA

College

NBA 

|-
| style="text-align:left;"|Milwaukee
| style="text-align:left;"|
|18||5||13|||| style="text-align:center;"|5th in Central||—||—||—||—
| style="text-align:center;"|Missed playoffs
|-
| style="text-align:left;"|Milwaukee
| style="text-align:left;"|
|82||26||56|||| style="text-align:center;"|5th in Central||—||—||—||—
| style="text-align:center;"|Missed playoffs
|- class="sortbottom"
| style="text-align:left;"|Career
| ||100||31||69|||| ||—||—||—||—

See also
List of NCAA Division I men's basketball players with 2000 points and 1000 rebounds

References

External links
 NBA stats @ Basketball-Reference.com

1964 births
Living people
Basketball coaches from Montana
American expatriate basketball people in France
American men's basketball players
American people of Polish descent
Basketball players from Montana
Chicago Bulls draft picks
Chicago Bulls players
Idaho Stampede (CBA) coaches
Idaho Stampede (CBA) players
Levallois Sporting Club Basket players
Los Angeles Lakers players
Milwaukee Bucks head coaches
Milwaukee Bucks players
Montana Grizzlies basketball coaches
Montana Grizzlies basketball players
New Jersey Nets assistant coaches
Orlando Magic players
People from Shelby, Montana
Power forwards (basketball)
San Antonio Spurs players
Sportspeople from Missoula, Montana
Utah Jazz players
Utah Utes men's basketball coaches